The 2021 Porto Challenger was a professional tennis tournament played on hard courts. It was the first edition of the tournament which was part of the 2021 ATP Challenger Tour. It took place in Porto, Portugal between 28 June and 4 July 2021.

Singles main-draw entrants

Seeds

 1 Rankings are as of 21 June 2021.

Other entrants
The following players received wildcards into the singles main draw:
  Nuno Borges
  Gastão Elias
  Gonçalo Oliveira

The following players received entry into the singles main draw as alternates:
  Nicola Kuhn
  Peter Polansky
  Matteo Viola

The following players received entry from the qualifying draw:
  Geoffrey Blancaneaux
  Ulises Blanch
  Sem Verbeek
  Yosuke Watanuki

The following player received entry as a lucky loser:
 Luís Faria

Champions

Singles

  Altuğ Çelikbilek def.  Quentin Halys 6–2, 6–1.

Doubles

  Guido Andreozzi /  Guillermo Durán def.  Renzo Olivo /  Miguel Ángel Reyes-Varela 6–7(5–7), 7–6(7–5), [11–9].

References

2021 ATP Challenger Tour
2021 in Portuguese tennis
June 2021 sports events in Portugal
July 2021 sports events in Portugal